Ernest Tippin (April 7, 1890 – October 30, 1958) was an American sports shooter. He competed in the 25 m rapid fire pistol event at the 1932 Summer Olympics.

References

1890 births
1958 deaths
American male sport shooters
Olympic shooters of the United States
Shooters at the 1932 Summer Olympics
People from Mankato, Kansas
Sportspeople from Kansas